Iván Navarro was the defending champion, but he chose to not defend his title.
In the final Rui Machado defeated 6–2, 6–7(6), 6–3 David Marrero.

Seeds

Draw

Final four

Top half

Bottom half

External links
 Main Draw
 Qualifying Draw

2009 Singles
Meknes,Singles